Calolziocorte (locally ) is a comune (municipality) in the Province of Lecco in the Italian region Lombardy, located about  northeast of Milan and about  southeast of Lecco.   Until 1992 it was part of the province of Bergamo.

Calolziocorte borders the following municipalities: Brivio, Carenno, Erve, Monte Marenzo, Olginate, Torre de' Busi, Vercurago.

Calolziocorte received the honorary title of city with a presidential decree on December 10, 2002.

It is served by Calolziocorte-Olginate railway station.

People
Michela Vittoria Brambilla,  politician
 Aureliano Brandolini,  agronomist and development cooperation scholar

References

External links
 Official website

Cities and towns in Lombardy